In mathematics, the Peano surface is the graph of the two-variable function

It was proposed by Giuseppe Peano in 1899 as a counterexample to a conjectured criterion for the existence of maxima and minima of functions of two variables.

The surface was named the Peano surface by Georg Scheffers in his 1920 book Lehrbuch der darstellenden Geometrie. It has also been called the Peano saddle.

Properties

At the origin, the three-dimensional point  on the surface that corresponds to the intersection point of the two parabolas, the surface has a saddle point. The surface itself has positive Gaussian curvature in some parts and negative curvature in others, separated by another parabola, implying that its Gauss map has a Whitney cusp.

Although the surface does not have a local maximum at the origin, its intersection with any vertical plane through the origin (a plane with equation  or ) is a curve that has a local maximum at the origin, a property described by Earle Raymond Hedrick as "paradoxical". In other words, if a point starts at the origin  of the plane, and moves away from the origin along any straight line, the value of  will decrease at the start of the motion.

The Peano surface is a quartic surface.

As a counterexample
In 1886 Joseph Alfred Serret published a textbook with a proposed criteria for the 
extremal points of a surface given by 
Here, it is assumed that the linear terms vanish and the Taylor series of  has the form

where  is a quadratic form like ,
Serret proposes that if  has constant sign for all points where  

In his 1884 notes to Angelo Genocchi's Italian textbook on calculus, Calcolo differenziale e principii di calcolo integrale, Peano had already provided different correct conditions for a function to attain a local minimum or local maximum. In the 1899 German translation of the same textbook, he provided this surface as a counterexample to Serret's condition. At the point , Serret's conditions are met, but this point is a saddle point, not a local maximum. A related condition to Serret's was also criticized by Ludwig Scheeffer, who used Peano's surface as a counterexample to it in an 1890 publication, credited to Peano.

Models
Models of Peano's surface are included in the Göttingen Collection of Mathematical Models and Instruments at the University of Göttingen, and in the mathematical model collection of TU Dresden (in two different models). The Göttingen model was the first new model added to the collection after World War I, and one of the last added to the collection overall.

References

External links

Differential geometry of surfaces
Algebraic surfaces